Kathleen Howard (July 27, 1884 – April 15, 1956) was a Canadian-born American opera singer, magazine editor, and character actress from the mid-1930s through the 1940s.

Biography
Howard was born in Clifton Hill, Niagara Falls, Ontario, Canada on July 27, 1884.

In 1906, Howard began her career in opera in Germany. Following eight years of singing in Berlin, she performed concerts in Belgium, England, Germany, Holland, and Scandinavia. She arrived in America in 1913 and joined the Metropolitan Opera in 1916. She remained a leading Met artist through 1928, taking major and secondary roles.

Howard created the role of Zita in Giacomo Puccini's Gianni Schicchi at the Metropolitan Opera in 1918. Until World War I, Howard was part of the repertory system in the opera houses of Metz and Darmstadt.

Beginning in 1918, for four years, Howard was the fashion editor of Harper's Bazaar magazine and while in that post was also president of Fashion Group International. She resigned to begin acting in films.

Her film debut came in Death Takes a Holiday (1934). She played Amelia, the nagging, shrewish wife of W.C. Fields in It's a Gift (1934), and appeared in two other Fields films: You're Telling Me! (1934) and Man on the Flying Trapeze (1935).

Howard died on April 15, 1956, aged 71, in Hollywood, California after a long illness. She was buried in Forest Lawn Cemetery in Buffalo, New York.

Legacy

Howard did not make as many opera recordings during the acoustical era as did her contemporaries Geraldine Farrar and Mary Garden, and thus was not as well known. Her few recordings were vertical-cut discs for Edison Records, playable only on Edison Disc Phonographs; and for the American branch of Pathé Frères in 1918, which received limited distribution. Among them are Harry Burleigh's arrangement of the spiritual "Deep River", arias from Charles Gounod's Faust and Giuseppe Verdi's Il Trovatore (in English), and the "Barcarolle" from Jacques Offenbach's Les contes d'Hoffmann with Claudia Muzio (in French).

Filmography

References

External links

Confessions of an Opera Singer freely available at gutenberg.org in many formats.

1884 births
1956 deaths
Burials at Forest Lawn Cemetery (Buffalo)
American film actresses
American magazine editors
American television actresses
Canadian film actresses
Canadian magazine editors
20th-century Canadian women opera singers
Canadian television actresses
Actresses from Ontario
Actresses from Buffalo, New York
20th-century American actresses
20th-century Canadian actresses
Women magazine editors
Canadian emigrants to the United States
20th-century American women opera singers